Rahim Jahani was a well known veteran singer from Afghanistan's pre-revolutionary music [era].  At one point in his lifetime, Jahani resided in the Silo district of Kabul. He was twice married, latterly to the singer Salma Jahani. 

Jahani died on November 29, 2014 in Sacramento, California.  Jahani has two daughters and one son, the eldest being his daughter Salma Jahani, the 2nd eldest being Rahe Jahani, and the youngest being Sonbol Jahani. His best-known song is "Ishq-e-Man," (pers.: My Love), which continues to be sung.

References

2014 deaths
1940s births
People from Kabul
Afghan Tajik people
Afghan male singers
Tajik-language singers
Persian-language singers
20th-century Afghan male singers
Afghan expatriates in the United States